Discovery Wings was a British TV channel devoted to documentaries regarding aircraft and as a brand extension of Wings, a staple documentary programme of the Discovery Channel throughout the 1990s. In the United States it has been replaced by the Military Channel, which still has a large portion of its programming dedicated to military aviation. The channel timeshared with Discovery Kids. It later ceased broadcasting on 28 February 2007.

The channel initially began broadcasting exclusively on the On Digital service time sharing with Discovery Kids, also created initially as an On Digital exclusive. The channel eventually became available on other digital platforms such as Sky Digital, and Virgin Media.

In the UK, Discovery Wings was axed in favour of a new channel called Discovery Turbo, on 1 March 2007 whose remit was widened to include also programmes related to speed and all motor vehicles.

See also
Discovery Home & Health (UK & Ireland)
Discovery Real Time
Discovery Kids (UK & Ireland)

References

External links
Discovery Channel UK

Wings
Defunct television channels in the United Kingdom
Television channels and stations established in 2000
Television channels and stations disestablished in 2007
Television channel articles with incorrect naming style